District 19 is an electoral district of the Minnesota Senate which covers portions of Hennepin and Wright counties in the northwestern Twin Cities metropolitan area.

Senators
 Amy Koch (January 5, 2006 – present)
 Mark Ourada ( – January 5, 2006)

Minnesota Senate districts
Hennepin County, Minnesota
Wright County, Minnesota